ECFS (East Caribbean Fiber System) is a network of repeaterless fiber optic submarine communications cable that interconnects fourteen (14) eastern Caribbean islands.  The cable is 1730 km (1075 mi) in length and runs from the British Virgin Islands to Trinidad in ten (10) segments.  It was first installed in September 1995 and was scheduled to be upgraded by Xtera Communications as of April 25, 2013.

Landing points 
Tortola, British Virgin Islands
Anguilla
St. Martin
St. Kitts & Nevis
Antigua
Montserrat
Guadeloupe
Dominica
Martinique
St. Lucia
Barbados
St. Vincent
Grenada
Trinidad

See also
 Cable & Wireless
 List of international submarine communications cables

References

External links
 

Liberty Latin America
Submarine communications cables in the Caribbean Sea
1995 establishments in North America